Andrzej Iwan (10 November 1959 – 27 December 2022) was a Polish professional footballer who played as a forward.

Club career 
Iwan made first steps on a long football career in Wanda Kraków, but in 1976 he moved to Wisła Kraków where he entered professional football, contributing a great deal to the title in 1978. He played 198 games and scored 69 goals for Wisła Kraków, before he was transferred to Górnik Zabrze. In next two years he proved to be a key player for a new team, a dominant force in the middle of 80s in Polish football. As he started career as a striker, he experienced transformation in Górnik Zabrze into a playmaker. He spent the last years of his professional career abroad (VfL Bochum, Aris Saloniki) punctuated by short returns to Górnik Zabrze. He won four Polish Championships (Wisła and Górnik) and ended up with 226 games and 90 goals in the Polish League. Additionally, he participated in 17 games in European club competitions and scored four goals.

International career
Iwan made his debut in the Polish national team in the second game of the 1978 FIFA World Cup, against Tunisia, at the age of 18, being the youngest player in the tournament. Four years later he became a first team player in the 1982 FIFA World Cup until injury in the second game ruled him out from the next games. He gave up the international career in 1987 with 11 goals in 29 matches.

Coaching careeer
On his retirement as a player, Iwan embarked on a coaching profession, for the first few years with a junior team in Wisła Kraków, leading him to the assistant position of the first team between 1999 and 2001, under Adam Nawałka and Orest Lenczyk. In Zagłębie Lubin, he was again an assistant to Adam Nawałka, however, they were relieved of their duties after only five months of working at the club. In 2003, Iwan leaped at the opportunity to lead a team, a fourth league club Okocimski KS Brzesko. He worked there for two years until his dismissal in 2005, following a series of defeats. Prior to that, Okocimski Brzesko had been close to promotion in 2004, but lost the play-offs to Kmita Zabierzów. Iwan managed three more teams, Płomien Jerzmanowice (fifth league, 2005–06) and Wiatra Ludźmierz (junior team, 2006) and Orlęta Rudawa until his coaching career was finally brought to a close.

Media careeer
In the last years, Iwan made regular appearance as football expert to commentate on Polish Ekstraklasa. Iwan's biography under the title "Spalony" (Offside) was released in 2012.

Personal life and death
Iwan was a father of Bartosz Iwan, a former player of Ekstraklasa sides, such as Widzew Łódź, Odra Wodzisław Śląski, Piast Gliwice and Górnik Zabrze.

Iwan died on 27 December 2022, at the age of 63.

Honours 
Wisła Kraków
 Ekstraklasa: 1977–78

Górnik Zabrze
 Ekstraklasa: 1985–86, 1986–87, 1987–88

Poland
FIFA World Cup third place: 1982

Poland U18
UEFA EURO U18 third place: 1978

Individual
Polish Footballer of the Year: 1987

References

External links
 

1959 births
2022 deaths
Footballers from Kraków
Polish footballers
Poland international footballers
Association football forwards
Polish football managers
1978 FIFA World Cup players
1982 FIFA World Cup players
Wisła Kraków players
Górnik Zabrze players
VfL Bochum players
Aris Thessaloniki F.C. players
Bundesliga players
Super League Greece players